Dr. Vibhuti Bhushan Sharma was the youngest president elected in the history of Rajasthan High Court Bar Association, Jaipur, elected in March 2012. He was also elected General Secretary of the same Association in 2007–2008. Sharma is also the Additional Advocate General for the Government of Rajasthan, thus represents State Government before the Rajasthan High Court.

The Indian National Congress appointed Sharma a member of the committee to monitor implementation of the Election Manifesto 2009. He served as a member of the Congress Manifesto Committee constituted by AICC (All India Congress Committee) for the 2013 Assembly Elections in the state of Rajasthan. He has also worked as a member of the Congress Manifesto Committee in the 2008 Assembly Elections.

He has an M.A. in Public Administration from the University of Rajasthan at Jaipur, a Ph.D. in Total Quality Education, an LL.B, and a Bachelor's in Journalism and Mass Communication.

References

20th-century Indian lawyers
Living people
1972 births